John Pendleton (1802–1868) was a congressman, diplomat, lawyer and farmer from Virginia.

John Pendleton may also refer to:
John Pendleton Jr. (1749–1806), Virginia government official
John O. Pendleton (1851–1916), U.S. Representative from West Virginia
John C. B. Pendleton (1871–1938), American football coach and stock broker
Jack J. Pendleton (1918–1944), United States Army soldier and Medal of Honor recipient